Bi-Metallic Investment Co. v. State Board of Equalization, 239 U.S. 441 (1915), was a United States Supreme Court case which held that due process protections attach only to administrative activities in which a small number of people are concerned, who are exceptionally affected by the act, in each case upon individual grounds. By contrast, rule-making or quasi-legislative activities that affect a large number of people without regard to the facts of individual cases do not implicate due process protections. It is an important case in United States administrative law.

Facts and procedural posture
The State Board of Equalization of the state of Colorado and the Colorado Tax Commission ordered that the valuation of all taxable property in Denver be increased by forty percent. Plaintiff company brought suit alleging that it had been deprived of its due process protections because a tax had been levied against its property without it being afforded an opportunity to be heard, in violation of the 14th Amendment.  The Colorado Supreme Court ordered that the suit be dismissed.

The Supreme Court of the United States affirmed the dismissal, holding that no due process rights are implicated when a tax is levied against a large number of people who are all affected equally.

Issue
Are all property owners entitled to an opportunity to be heard prior to adoption of an administrative order that increases property taxes?

Holding and decision
The Due Process clause of the Fourteenth Amendment provides that the government may not deprive an individual of life, liberty, or property without notice and an opportunity to be heard. Where an agency rule will apply to a vast number of people, the Constitution does not require that each be given an opportunity to be heard directly for the purpose of arguing in favor of or against its adoption. In cases such as this, it would be impractical to allow all individuals affected to offer a direct voice in support of or in opposition to an order. Thus, the Constitution is satisfied by the fact that, as voters, the taxpayers exercise power, remote or direct, over those responsible for the order. Accordingly, the judgment of the state supreme court dismissing this suit must be affirmed.

Analysis
The Court distinguishes this case from Londoner v. City and County of Denver, a 1908 case in which the Court held that individual taxpayers had a right to a hearing before an individualized benefits tax was assessed. The apparent conflict between the two cases is explained by Justice Holmes's observation that in Londoner, "a relatively small number of persons was concerned, who were exceptionally affected, in each case upon individual grounds..." In contrast, here the taxpayers in Denver are affected equally, and in large numbers, and it would be an impractical impediment to government to afford all of them individual hearings. Instead, "their rights are protected in the only way that they can be in a complex society, by their power, immediate or remote, over those who make the rule." In other words, there was no violation of the Fourteenth Amendment because the taxpayers of Denver retained the right to organize and vote.

See also
List of United States Supreme Court cases, volume 239

References

Further reading

External links

United States Supreme Court cases
United States Supreme Court cases of the White Court
United States civil due process case law
United States administrative case law
1915 in United States case law
Property taxes
History of Denver
Legal history of Colorado